Fernando Herrera Espinoza (born July 4, 1985) is a former Mexican football midfielder. He last played for Potros UAEM.

Career
Herrera broke into the Atlante first team on October 13, 2007, in a 2–1 loss to CF Pachuca. He had been promoted to the first squad by manager José Guadalupe Cruz, who noticed his playing ability at Atlante's filial team, Pegaso Real de Colima.

Honors

Club
Atlante F.C.
  Apertura 2007

External links
 

1985 births
Living people
Liga MX players
Atlante F.C. footballers
C.F. Mérida footballers
Association football midfielders
Footballers from Mexico City
Mexican footballers